Robert Jackson may refer to:

Politics and government
Robert Jackson (coroner) (died 1439), coroner, esquire, bailiff and landowner of Sunderland, England
Robert Jackson (Berwick-upon-Tweed MP) (c. 1584–1645), English politician, MP for Berwick-upon-Tweed, 1621–1626
Robert R. Jackson (1870–1942), Illinois legislator and Chicago City Council member
Robert Jackson (Ipswich MP) (1880–1951), British politician, MP for Ipswich, 1923–1924
Robert H. Jackson (1892–1954), United States Attorney General, Supreme Court Justice, and chief United States prosecutor at the Nuremberg Trials
Robert L. Jackson Jr. (born 1936), member of the Wisconsin State Assembly
Robert Jackson (Canadian politician) (born 1936), member of the Legislative Assembly of New Brunswick
Robert Jackson (Wantage MP) (born 1946), British politician, MP for Wantage, 1983–2005
Robert L. Jackson (Mississippi politician) (born 1955), Mississippi State Senator
Robert E. Jackson, city commissioner and later mayor of Largo, Florida, 2000–2006
Robert Jackson (New York politician), New York City Council member 2002–2013, subsequently state senator

Diplomacy and International administration
Sir Robert Jackson (UN administrator) (1911–1991), Australian United Nations administrator
Robert P. Jackson (born 1956), American foreign service officer and diplomat, ambassador to Cameroon and Ghana
Robert D. Jackson, Canadian diplomat

Military
Robert Jackson (surgeon, born 1750) (1750–1827), Scottish physician-surgeon, reformer, and inspector-general of army hospitals
Sir Robert William Jackson (1826–1921), British Army surgeon
Robert Jackson (general) (1886–1948), Australian Army general

Sports

American football
Robert Jackson (American football coach) (1921–2010), American college football coach
Robert Jackson (guard) (born 1953), American football player
Robert Jackson (linebacker) (born 1954), American football player
Robert Jackson (safety) (born 1958), American football player
Rob Jackson (American football) (born 1985), American football player
Robert Jackson (cornerback) (born 1993), American football player

Other sports
Robert Jackson (baseball) (dates unknown), American 19th-century Negro leagues baseball player
Robert W. Jackson (died 2010), Canadian orthopedic surgeon, founder of the Canadian Wheelchair Sport Association and a member of the Canadian Paralympic Committee
Rob Jackson (rugby league) (born 1981), English rugby league player
Scoop Jackson (writer) (Robert Jackson, born 1963), American sports journalist

Other
Robert Wyse Jackson (1908–1976), Irish bishop and author
Robert H. Jackson (photographer) (born 1934), American news photographer
Robert Jackson (astronomer) (born 1949), American astronomer
Robert Jackson (educator) (born 1945), British educator and educational researcher
Robert C. Jackson (born 1964), American painter and author
Robert J. Jackson Jr. (born 1977), American lawyer and academic

Fictional
Robbie Jackson, fictional character in the British television show EastEnders
Robby Jackson, fictional character in the novels of American author Tom Clancy

See also 
Bob Jackson (disambiguation)
Bobby Jackson (disambiguation)